One Minute to Twelve (German: Eine Minute vor Zwölf) is a 1925 German silent drama film directed by Nunzio Malasomma and starring Luciano Albertini, Charlotte Ander and Elsa Wagner.

In 1927 it was released in Britain by Gaumont British Distributors.

Cast
 Luciano Albertini as Fred 
 Charlotte Ander as Mary - eine Modistin  
 Elsa Wagner as Freds Mutter 
 Oreste Bilancia as Der Marquis Belplano  
 Hugo Döblin as Der Chefredakteur der 'Schnellsten Nachrichten'  
 Anna Gorilowa as Die Marquise Belplano  
 Barbara von Annenkoff as Die Fürstin von Kantorowitz

References

Bibliography
 Grange, William. Cultural Chronicle of the Weimar Republic. Scarecrow Press, 2008.

External links
 

1925 films
Films of the Weimar Republic
Films directed by Nunzio Malasomma
German silent feature films
1925 drama films
German drama films
German black-and-white films
Bavaria Film films
Silent drama films
1920s German films